Henry was a sloop launched at Plymouth in 1820. She sailed to the New South Shetland Islands and returned from there on 12 May 1822. Thereafter she sailed between Plymouth or London and Malaga. She had undergone lengthening in 1824, and conversion to a cutter c.1837. She was last listed in 1843.

Career
Henry first appeared in Lloyd's Register (LR) in 1820 with R.Cundy, master, H.Rowe, owner, and trade Plymouth–Saint Michaels.

In 1820 the mariner William Smith, captain of William, discovered the South Shetland Islands. Once news arrived in England of the number of seals there many vessels sailed there to gather seal skins and oil. Henry was one of the vessels sailing there.

Henry arrived back at Plymouth on 12 May 1822 from the South Shetland Islands. She had left on 3 February and she reported on the 19 British vessels she had left there, giving the number of skins and tons of seal oil each had gathered. There were also 20 American ships there.

On 30 January 1823 Henry, Cock, master, was off Ram Head, coming from Saint Michael, when she came across the rigging, etc. of a schooner. The schooner Tagus, Reynolds, master was missing.

LR for 1824 showed Henrys master as S.Cock, changing to Westcott, her owner as Chanter, and her trade as Plymouth–Gibraltar. She had undergone a thorough repair and lengthening in 1824 that increased her burthen to 59 tons.

Lloyd's List reported on 8 January 1828 that Henry, Westcott, master, was at Thurlstone, having been carried into port. On 3 March 1835 it reported that Henry, Towson, master, had been brought into Whitstable damaged.

Fate
Henry was last listed in 1843.

Citations

1820 ships
Age of Sail merchant ships of England
Sealing ships
Maritime incidents in January 1828
Maritime incidents in March 1835